Alaa Mohamad Kheir Mezher (born 12 December 1992) is a Lebanese professional footballer who plays as a winger for Emirati club Gulf FC.

Career

Youth career 
Born in the United Arab Emirates, Mezher began his youth career at Al-Shaab and Sharjah, before joining the youth sector of Italian club Juventus in 2009.

Lebanon 
Mezher moved to Lebanon in 2012, playing for Chabab Ghazieh in the 2012–13 Lebanese Premier League. He scored a goal against Safa, in a 5–1 defeat.

Mezher then played for Salam Zgharta in the 2015–16 season, and moved to Safa ahead of the 2016–17 season. He came on as a substitute in Safa's 2–0 defeat to Nejmeh in the Lebanese Super Cup.

BTU United and Shabab Arabi 
In January 2017, Mezher moved to BTU United in the Thai League 4 on a one-year contract. He moved back to the Lebanese Premier League in summer 2017, playing for newly-promoted side Shabab Arabi in the 2017–18 season.

United Arab Emirates 
In summer 2018, Mezher joined Dibba Al Fujairah in the UAE Pro League. He played seven games in all competitions – two in the league.

Mezher then moved to the UAE Division One, playing for Hatta in the second half of the 2018–19 season, and Al Hamriya in the 2020–21 season. On 19 January 2021, Al Hamriyah terminated Mezher's contract on mutual consent.

Nejmeh 
On 7 August 2021, Mezher returned to Lebanon, signing for Nejmeh ahead of the 2021–22 season. He left the club in June 2022, following the end of his contract.

Return to the UAE 
In July 2022, Mezher moved back to the UAE, joining Gulf FC in the UAE First Division.

Personal life 
Mezher is a Lebanese citizen born in the United Arab Emirates who holds Emirati residence.

Honours 
Safa
 Lebanese FA Cup runner-up: 2016–17
 Lebanese Super Cup runner-up: 2016

Nejmeh
 Lebanese FA Cup: 2021–22
 Lebanese Elite Cup: 2021
 Lebanese Super Cup runner-up: 2021

References

External links
 
 
 

1992 births
Living people
Sportspeople from Dubai
Lebanese footballers
Association football wingers
Al-Shaab CSC players
Sharjah FC players
Juventus F.C. players
Chabab Ghazieh SC players
Salam Zgharta FC players
Safa SC players
Nonthaburi United S.Boonmeerit F.C. players
Al Shabab Al Arabi Club Beirut players
Dibba FC players
Hatta Club players
Al Hamriyah Club players
Nejmeh SC players
Gulf Heroes FC players
Lebanese Premier League players
Alaa Mezher
UAE Pro League players
UAE First Division League players
Lebanese expatriate footballers
Lebanese expatriate sportspeople in Thailand
Expatriate footballers in Thailand